The 1946 Youngstown Penguins football team was an American football team that represented Youngstown University (now known as Youngstown State University) as an independent during the 1946 college football season. In their eighth year under head coach Dike Beede, the Penguins compiled a 7–1 record and outscored opponents by a total of 190 to 89. They played their home games at Rayen Stadium in Youngstown, Ohio.

Schedule

References

Youngstown
Youngstown State Penguins football seasons
Youngstown Penguins football